The 2011 IRB Junior World Rugby Trophy was the fourth annual international rugby union competition for Under 20 national teams, second-tier world championship. The event was organised by rugby's governing body, the International Rugby Board (IRB). Two venues were used, both located in Tbilisi. 12 of the 16 games were played at the Avchala Stadium, the other 4 games at the Shevardeni Stadium.

Pool stage
All times are local (UTC+4).

Pool A

{| class="wikitable" style="text-align: center;"
|-
!width="200"|Team
!width="20"|Pld
!width="20"|W
!width="20"|D
!width="20"|L
!width="20"|TF
!width="20"|PF
!width="20"|PA
!width="25"|PD
!width="20"|BP
!width="20"|Pts
|-
|align=left| 
|3||3||0||0||21||135||31||+104||3||15
|-
|align=left| 
|3||2||0||1||7||72||47||+25||1||9
|-
|align=left| 
|3||1||0||2||8||61||119||−58||1||5
|-
|align=left| 
|3||0||0||3||7||52||123||−71||2||2
|}

Pool B

{| class="wikitable" style="text-align: center;"
|-
!width="200"|Team
!width="20"|Pld
!width="20"|W
!width="20"|D
!width="20"|L
!width="20"|TF
!width="20"|PF
!width="20"|PA
!width="25"|PD
!width="20"|BP
!width="20"|Pts
|-
|align=left| 
|3||3||0||0||13||96||53||+43||3||15
|-
|align=left| 
|3||2||0||1||12||102||57||+45||2||10
|-
|align=left| 
|3||1||0||2||10||73||91||−18||1||5
|-
|align=left| 
|3||0||0||3||8||66||136||−70||0||0
|}

Knockout stage

7th place game

5th place game

Third place game

Final

References

External links

2011
2011 rugby union tournaments for national teams
International rugby union competitions hosted by Georgia (country)
rugby union
2011
rugby union